Abdulla Seyidahmadov (born on 5 April 1997) is an Azerbaijani football goalkeeper who plays for Zira in the Azerbaijan Premier League.

Club career
On 4 March 2018, Seyidahmadov made his debut in the Azerbaijan Premier League for Zira match against Keşla.

References

External links
 

1997 births
Living people
Association football goalkeepers
Azerbaijani footballers
Azerbaijan Premier League players
Zira FK players